Bobs Lake is a lake in geographic Gamey Township in the Unorganized North Part of Sudbury District in Northeastern Ontario, Canada. It is in the James Bay drainage basin and is part of the Moose River system.

Hydrology
The primary inflow, at the northeast, and outflow, at the northwest, is Roswell Creek. Roswell Creek flows to the Nemegosenda River, then via the Kapuskasing River, the Mattagami River and the Moose River to James Bay.

References

Lakes of Sudbury District